The R. H. Long Motors Company was a Framingham, Massachusetts-based automobile manufacturer that operated from 1922 to 1926. They produced the Bay State model automobile, which used a Continental Motors Company six-cylinder engine.

The company was founded by Richard H. Long, a shoe manufacturer from Framingham. During World War I, Long's factory switched to manufacturing war supplies, including high-grade automobile bodies. In 1922, R. H. Long Motors Company began production of the Bay State.

Although R. H. Long Motors ceased car production in 1926, the Long Automotive Group, an automobile dealership founded in 1927, was started from the remains of the business. Long Automotive still exists today in Southborough, Massachusetts (Long Cadillac), the world's oldest continually-owned Cadillac dealership, and Webster, Massachusetts (Long Subaru).

One remaining Bay State car, a 1925 model, is known to exist.

References

1922 establishments in Massachusetts
1926 disestablishments in Massachusetts
American companies established in 1922
American companies disestablished in 1926
Companies based in Framingham, Massachusetts
Defunct manufacturing companies based in Massachusetts
Defunct motor vehicle manufacturers of the United States
History of Middlesex County, Massachusetts
Motor vehicle assembly plants in Massachusetts
Vehicle manufacturing companies established in 1922
Vehicle manufacturing companies disestablished in 1926